William Hogarth  (13 January 1911 – 13 May 1973) was a Scottish laborer organiser who was General Secretary of the National Union of Seamen, elected in 1962.

A native of Glasgow, he began his career as a deck boy making 50 shillings a month. He was appointed a Commander of the Order of the British Empire in the 1972 Birthday Honours.

References

1911 births
1973 deaths
Trade unionists from Glasgow
General Secretaries of the National Union of Seamen
Commanders of the Order of the British Empire
20th-century British businesspeople